St. Gabriel's RC Primary School may refer to:

 St. Gabriel's Catholic Primary School, Belgrave, Tamworth, Staffordshire, UK  
 St. Gabriel's R.C. Primary School, Rochdale, UK 
 St Gabriel's Catholic Primary School, Stoke-on-Trent, UK  
 St Gabriel's R C Primary School, Prestonpans, UK